Ectoedemia atrifrontella is a moth of the family Nepticulidae. It is found in most of Europe except Iceland, Ireland, Belgium and most of the Balkan Peninsula. It is also present in the Near East.

The wingspan is 7–9 mm. Adults are on wing from June to September.

The larvae feed on various Quercus species. Unlike most other Nepticulidae species, the larvae mine the bark of their host, rather than the leaves. They prefer younger branches. The mine consists of a contorted gallery in smooth bark of branches and thin trunks. The larva feeds mainly in the direction of the main axis.

External links
UKmoths
A Taxonomic Revision Of The Western Palaearctic Species Of The Subgenera Zimmermannia Hering And Ectoedemia Busck s.str. (Lepidoptera, Nepticulidae), With Notes On Their Phylogeny

Nepticulidae
Moths of Europe
Moths of Asia
Moths described in 1851